Pampanito is one of the 20 municipalities of the state of Trujillo, Venezuela. The municipality occupies an area of 93 km2 with a population of 31,836 inhabitants according to the 2011 census.

Parishes
The municipality consists of the following two parishes:

 La Concepción (Pampanito)
 Pampanito
 Pampanito II

References

Municipalities of Trujillo (state)